Billy Godwin (born November 19, 1964) is an American college baseball coach and former pitcher. He is the head baseball coach at the University of North Carolina at Greensboro. Godwin played college baseball at Atlantic Christian College in 1986. He was the head baseball coach of East Carolina from 2006 to 2014.  In , Godwin was listed as an area scout, based in Emerald Isle, North Carolina, for the New York Yankees of Major League Baseball.

Early years
Godwin was born in Rocky Mount, North Carolina, and attended Northern Nash High School.  He then earned an athletic scholarship as a pitcher in 1982 to attend Atlantic Christian College, now Barton College.  He was named team captain in 1986 and Kiwanis Award for the Most Outstanding Male Student-Athlete.  He graduated in 1986 in Business Administration.  His first coaching job came at North Carolina Wesleyan College in 1989 and 1990.  He was the assistant coach to current UNC head coach Mike Fox.  The two guided NCWC to the NCAA Division 3 baseball championship in 1989 and a third-place finish a year later.

Head coach 
Godwin's first head coaching stint came at Enfield Academy, a private school in Nash County, North Carolina. Starting in 1991 he was the athletic director and head baseball coach.  During the seven seasons (1991–1997) as head coach, he accumulated a 131–57 (.697) record.  During this time Enfield Academy baseball team had five consecutive conference championships, four straight Final Four appearances and a state title in 1994.

After Enfield Academy, Godwin became Cary Academy's first athletic director in 1997.

Godwin's next head coaching job came at Louisburg College.  During his six-year term, he earned a 262–85 (.755) overall record. During the 2005 season, Godwin guided the Hurricanes to Region X regular season and tournament titles on his way to earning Region X Coach-of-the-Year honors. The 2005 Hurricanes finished the regular season with a 49–13 record and stood sixth nationally in the NJCAA Division I final regular season poll. In 2004, the Hurricanes went 40–18 and claimed the top seed at the Region X Tournament before finishing the campaign as a regional finalist.

After taking the helm at Louisburg College in the fall of 1999, Godwin kept the Hurricanes in the national spotlight by averaging 43 wins per season. The Hurricanes finished with a school-record 51–11 mark in 2002 and made their tenth trip to the College World Series in Grand Junction, Colorado. During his tenure at Louisburg, Godwin earned Region X and Eastern District Coach-of-the-Year honors, received the North Carolina College Coach-of-the-Year award in 2002.

East Carolina 
Godwin first came to ECU as an assistant coach on June 9, 2005.  After Randy Mazey resigned his position as head coach, Godwin was tapped as interim head coach on October 10, 2005, then was named permanently to the position on October 28, 2005.  For his first year as head coach, his record was 33–26.

Godwin's team also earned many awards and recognition during his first year.  Senior catcher Jake Smith earned the Johnny Bench Award, which is given annually to the nations top collegiate catcher. Four Pirates earned All-Conference honors.  The 2006 Pirates ranked among the league leaders (all games) in average (.305), runs scored (381), total bases (939), slugging percentage (.452), hits (633), triples (13), RBI (342), home runs (58), ERA (4.34), runs allowed (296), opposing batting average (.282) and runners picked off (10). His 2009 team made it to the Super Regionals before losing to the University of North Carolina at Chapel Hill. Godwin earned a master's degree in education in 1995 from East Carolina University.

UNC Greensboro
On August 8, 2019, Godwin was named the head baseball coach at the University of North Carolina at Greensboro.

Head coaching records
Below is a table of Godwin's yearly records as an NCAA head baseball coach.

References

External links
 Godwin Official Biography

1964 births
Living people
Barton Bulldogs baseball players
Baseball pitchers
East Carolina Pirates baseball coaches
East Carolina University alumni 
High school baseball coaches in the United States
Louisburg Hurricanes baseball coaches
New York Yankees scouts
North Carolina Wesleyan Battling Bishops baseball coaches
UNC Greensboro Spartans baseball coaches
People from Rocky Mount, North Carolina
People from Emerald Isle, North Carolina
Baseball coaches from North Carolina